Eucalyptus burracoppinensis, commonly known as Burracoppin mallee is a mallee that is endemic to Western Australia. It has smooth bark, except for a short "stocking" of loose rough bark at the base, lance-shaped adult leaves, flower buds arranged in groups of three, white flowers and top-shaped fruit.

Description
It has smooth grey and coppery to pink bark, except at the base of the trunk where there are persistent strips of rough, loose greyish bark. Flowering mainly occurs between August and November and the flowers are white.

Taxonomy and naming
Eucalyptus burracoppensis was first formally described in 1925 by Joseph Maiden and William Blakely and the description was published in Journal and Proceedings of the Royal Society of New South Wales. The specific epithet (burracopinensis) refers to Burracoppin, the ending -ensis is a Latin suffix "denoting place", "locality" or "country".

Distribution and habitat
Burracoppin mallee is found on sandplains in scattered areas of the central and eastern wheatbelt region between Ballidu, Bullfinch, Kondinin and Marvel Loch.

Conservation status
This eucalypt is classified as "not threatened" by the Western Australian Government Department of Parks and Wildlife.

Use in horticulture
This eucalypt is a slow growing, drought tolerant mallee sold as an ornamental, hedge, shelterbelt and windbreak that can grow in low rainfall areas.

See also
 List of Eucalyptus species

References

Eucalypts of Western Australia
Trees of Australia
burracoppinensis
Myrtales of Australia
Plants described in 1925
Taxa named by William Blakely
Taxa named by Joseph Maiden